Abelardo Castro Ramírez (born 7 October 1892, date of death unknown) was a Chilean fencer. He competed in the individual and team sabre events during the 1928 Summer Olympics.

Notes

References

1892 births
Year of death missing
Chilean male sabre fencers
Olympic fencers of Chile
Fencers at the 1928 Summer Olympics
20th-century Chilean people